A constitutional referendum was held in Burma on 15 December 1973. The new constitution was approved by 94.5% of voters, with voter turnout reported to be 95.5%.

Results

References

Constitutional referendum
Referendums in Myanmar
Burmese constitutional referendum
Burmese constitutional referendum
Constitutional referendums
History of Myanmar (1948–present)